St John the Baptist Church is a parish church in the Church of England located in Knaresborough, North Yorkshire.  It is the largest church in the town.

History
Records of a church on this site date back to at least 1114 when records from Nostell Priory, Wakefield show that King Henry I granted the "Church at Cnaresburgh" to the canons at Nostell.  The church was originally dedicated to St Mary but was changed to its current name in the 16th century following reform after the English reformation.  The bells were hung in 1774 and the clock erected in 1884.

On 5 February 1952 the church was designated a grade I listed building.

Present day
The church is located off Church Lane close to the North bank of the River Nidd. The church was the seat of the suffragan Bishop of Knaresborough.

The parish of Knaresborough is part of the Archdeaconry of Richmond and Craven in the Diocese of Leeds.

Gallery

References

External links

 Parish website

Anglican Diocese of Leeds
Church of England church buildings in North Yorkshire
Grade I listed churches in North Yorkshire